This is a list of the Sites of Special Scientific Interest (SSSIs) in the Wrexham Area of Search (AoS).

Sites

References

Wrexham
Wrexham